The 1989 Barber Saab Pro Series season was the fourth season of the series. All drivers used Saab powered Goodyear shod Mondiale chassis. Robbie Buhl won the championship.

Race calendar and results

Final standings

References

Barber Dodge Pro Series
1989 in American motorsport